Joseph Albert Wiggins (1 April 1909 – 1982) was an English professional footballer who played as a centre forward and full back for Brentford, Leicester City, Gillingham, Rochdale and Oldham Athletic in the Football League. He also played for Hanwell Town, Grays Thurrock, Stalybridge Celtic, Hurst and Rhyl.

Career statistics

References

1909 births
1982 deaths
People from Alperton
Footballers from the London Borough of Brent
English footballers
Grays Thurrock United F.C. players
Brentford F.C. players
Leicester City F.C. players
Gillingham F.C. players
Rochdale A.F.C. players
Oldham Athletic A.F.C. players
Stalybridge Celtic F.C. players
Ashton United F.C. players
Rhyl F.C. players
English Football League players
Association football defenders
Association football forwards